Vaarasatwam is a 1964 Indian Telugu-language drama film produced by Mangalampalli Brothers under Subhodaya Pictures and directed by Tapi Chanakya. It stars N. T. Rama Rao and Anjali Devi, with music composed by Ghantasala.

Plot 
Zamindar Vallabharayudu (Narayana Swamy), a millionaire does not have any heir, exploiting the situation, his distant relative Narasimha (Rajanala) a vicious person, is waiting to grab the property. Raghu (N. T. Rama Rao), an educated youth with a noble character lives in a village, with his money-minded father Chitti Babu (Dr. Sivaramakrishnaiah), sister Swarajyam (Surabhi Balasaraswathi) and cousin Seeta (Girija). Once Raghu moves to the city for his friend Giri's (Peketi Sivaram) wedding. On the way, he rescues Vallabharayudu from Narasimha when  Vallabharayudu promises him to give Rs.50,000 whenever he requires it. At that moment, Vallabharayudu also decides to make remarriage for an heir. After reaching the city, Raghu gets acquainted with a guy Sanjeevi (Relangi) and they become good friends. Afterward, Raghu attends the marriage, which gets canceled due to a dowry problem, and the bride Shanta (Anjali Devi) tries to commit suicide when Raghu saves her. Shanta's father Venkataramaiah (Gummadi) is impressed by Raghu's character, so, appoints him as his secretary and falls in love with Shanta. Unfortunately, Narasimha is Venkataramaiah's brother-in-law who has a bad eye on Shanta and wants to marry her. Parallelly, Sanjeevi falls in love with Swarajyam and marries her. On the other side, Chittibabu fixes Seeta's alliance with Vallabharayudu for money. Raghu tries to stop it but is instead blamed on Seeta. Time passes, and Vallabharayudu's long-standing wish gets fulfilled as Seeta gives birth to a baby boy, but unfortunately, Vallabharayudu dies within a few days placing the entire property in his inheritance. Here Narasimha ploys by separating everyone from Seeta and takes authority. At the same time, Venkataramaiah is bankrupted, when Raghu remembers the word given by Vallabharayudu. So, he reaches their house and gets insulted. Narasimha misuses the situation by helping Venkataramaiah with Vallabharayudu's money. Now Narasimham decides to eliminate the heir, so, he orders his henchmen to kill the child, but accidentally the child lands in Raghu's hand when Shanta suspects him, thereafter, she realizes the truth and learns about Narasimha's evil play, so, she secretly hides the child. Both Raghu & Narashima are in search of the child. At last, Raghu rescues the baby from Narasimha and hands him over to Seeta, but she requests Raghu & Shanta be his parents. Finally, the movie ends on a happy note.

Cast 
N. T. Rama Rao as Raghu
Anjali Devi as Shanta
Rajanala as Narasimham
Gummadi as Venkata Rao
Relangi as Sanjeevi
Raja Babu
Allu Ramalingaiah as Sanyasi
Peketi Sivaram as Giri
Vangara as Sidhanthi
Dr. Sivaramakrishnaiah as Chittibabu
Narayana Swamy as Vallabharayudu
Y. V. Raju as Purushotham
Girija as Seeta
 Hemalatha
Radha Kumari
Surabhi Balasaraswathi as Swarajyam
Nirmalamma as Kanthamma

Soundtrack 
Music composed by Ghantasala.

References

External links 
 

1964 drama films
1964 films
Films directed by Tapi Chanakya
Films scored by Ghantasala (musician)
Indian drama films